Cat Feud is a 1958 Warner Bros. Merrie Melodies animated short film directed by Chuck Jones. The cartoon was released on December 20, 1958, and features Marc Antony and Pussyfoot.

In this short, Marc Antony is grey, whereas in previous shorts he was brown.

Plot
Marc Antony is guarding a construction site when he spots a moving paper bag and begins barking at it. Pussyfoot comes out of the bag, and he barks at her. However, she is not afraid, believing that the dog is her friend. In reaction, Marc Antony's emotions soften. Before returning to guard duty, he leaves Pussyfoot a sausage for her to snack on and she gratefully kisses him. However, trouble is ahead, thanks to a hungry alley cat who has seen the sausage and wants it for himself.

Seeing the struggle, Marc Antony catches on and beats up the cat. Then it becomes a cat and mouse game between the two as Marc Antony does all he can to protect Pussyfoot and the sausage he gave her from the cat. The final confrontation ends with the cat stuck below on a magnet in a bucket, while Marc Antony endures brief pain and barks out "Rock-a-bye Baby" as Pussyfoot makes herself comfortable before falling asleep. Relieved, the bulldog likewise falls asleep himself.

Censorship
The original version of the cartoon showed a car driving by the construction site and throwing the bag out, which landed in the trash can (thus explaining why Pussyfoot was in both the bag and the trash can in the first place). This scene has been cut from all versions of the cartoon since the late 1980s.

Home media
This cartoon is featured on Disc 4 of the Looney Tunes Golden Collection: Volume 4.

References

External links 
 

1958 films
1958 animated films
1958 short films
Short films directed by Chuck Jones
Merrie Melodies short films
Warner Bros. Cartoons animated short films
Animated films about cats
Animated films about dogs
Films scored by Milt Franklyn
1950s Warner Bros. animated short films
Animated films without speech
Films with screenplays by Michael Maltese
1950s English-language films